Thomas Dick (20 May 1880 – 10 October 1938) was a British gymnast. He competed in the men's artistic individual all-around event at the 1908 Summer Olympics.

References

1880 births
1938 deaths
British male artistic gymnasts
Olympic gymnasts of Great Britain
Gymnasts at the 1908 Summer Olympics
Sportspeople from Dundee